Fearless Planet is a program broadcast by The Discovery Channel. It was hosted by Will Gadd. The series was a six-episode documentary, airing weekly on Sundays from November 11 to December 16, 2007, at 10 p.m. ET/9 p.m. CT.  The program was about the geology of the Earth and how some natural structures are created.

Episodes and airdates

See also
 List of programs broadcast by The Discovery Channel
 Geology

References

External links
 
 Fearless Planet on Discovery Channel
 Fearless Planet Episode Guide and original airdates
 Fearless Planet TV Schedule

Discovery Channel original programming
2007 American television series debuts
2007 American television series endings